Altınabat is a village in the Aydın Province. As of 2010, it had a population of 343 people.

References

Villages in Çine District